Isadore Rush ( 1866 – November 14, 1904) was an American stage actress who performed in vaudeville and on Broadway. 

Rush was born in Berwick, Pennsylvania. She was married to comedian Roland Reed, making her a stepmother of actress Florence Reed. Previously she was married to a man named White and by him had a daughter, Maud White, who was a young stage actress at the time of Rush's death and married to actor Tyrone Power.

Rush drowned off San Diego near the beach at the Hotel del Coronado in November 1904.

References

External links

Portraits in the University of Washington Sayre collection
Portrait in the New York Public Library Billy Rose collection

1904 deaths
Actresses from Pennsylvania
Actors from Wilkes-Barre, Pennsylvania
Deaths by drowning in California
Year of birth uncertain
19th-century American actresses
American stage actresses